The Westfield Sydney to Melbourne Ultramarathon was an annual ultramarathon foot race held between 1983 and 1991. It was sponsored by the Westfield Group, with the start being at Westfield Parramatta shopping centre and the finish at Westfield Doncaster shopping centre (formerly known as "Doncaster Shoppingtown").

It was particularly notable for having been won in 1983 by Cliff Young, an almost unknown 61-year-old potato farmer from Beech Forest, Victoria.

Yiannis Kouros won the men's race five times. In 1988, the race organiser challenged him to start 12 hours behind the rest of the field. Kouros overtook his competitors and won the race with a one-hour lead over New Zealander Dick Tout.

The first woman to compete was Australian Caroline Vaughan who ran in 1984. Vaughan did not finish the race. In 1985, three women competed and finished: British ultramarathon runner Eleanor Robinson (then Eleanor Adams), Donna Hudson of the US and Australian Margaret Smith. Robinson won the women's race three times.

The final running of the event included prize money ($60,000 for first place), a handicapping system and a change to the course. It ceased being held when the Westfield Group withdrew its support.

Results

1983 
Cliff Young: 5d 15h 04m
George Perdon: 6d 01h 00m
Siggy Bauer: 6d 05h 00m
6 finishers

1984 
Geoff Molloy: 6d 04h 02m
John Hughes: 6d 06h 00m
Wal McCrorie: 6d 16h 21m
9 finishers

1985 
Men's race
Yiannis Kouros: 5d 05h 07m
Siggy Bauer: 6d 05h 46m
Brian Bloomer: 6d 17h 20m
Women's race

 Eleanor Robinson: 8d 00h 30m
 Donna Hudson: 8d 11h 57m
 Margaret Smith: 8d 16h 28m

11 finishers

1986 
Men's race
: 6d 12h 38m
Brian Bloomer: 7d 04h 53m
Patrick Macke: 7d 13h 02m
Women's race

 Eleanor Robinson: 7d 17h 58m
 Donna Hudson: 8d 06h 15m
 Christine Barrett: 8d 22h 30m

9 finishers

1987 
Men's race
Yiannis Kouros: 5d 14h 47m
Patrick Macke: 6d 17h 21m
Dick Tout: 6d 22h 19m
Women's race

 Cynthia Cameron: 8d 10h 55m
 Mary Hanudel: 8d 12h 44m

16 finishers

1988 
Men's race
Yiannis Kouros: 5d 19h 14m
Dick Tout: 6d 11h 18m
Dusan Mravlje: 6d 14h 10m
Women's race

 Eleanor Robinson: 7d 10h 5m
 Sandra Barwick: 8d 04h 10m

23 finishers

1989 
Yiannis Kouros: 5d 02h 27m
David Standeven: 5d 13h 55m
Kevin Mansell: 5d 22h 59m
19 finishers

1990 
Men's race
Yiannis Kouros: 5d 23h 55m
Bryan Smith: 6d 09h 45m
Peter Quirk: 6d 11h 40m
Women's race

 Sandra Barwick: 7d 04h 46m

20 finishers

1991 
Bryan Smith: 6d 12h 50m (24h handicap)
Tony Collins: 7d 04h 17m (12h handicap)
Andrew Law: 7d 09h 32m (12h handicap)
Maurice Taylor: 6d 23h 22m (24h handicap)
Kevin Mansell: 7d 02h 26m (24h handicap)
11 finishers

References

External links 
 Sydney to Melbourne Ultramarathon at statistik.d-u-v.org
 

Multiday races
Recurring sporting events established in 1983
Recurring events disestablished in 1991
Marathons in Australia